Elmo Noel Joseph Perara (December 4, 1932 – April 9, 2015) was a Roman Catholic bishop.

Perera was ordained to the priesthood in 1960. In 1992, Perera was named auxiliary bishop of the Roman Catholic Diocese of Galle, Sri Lanka and then, in 1995, diocesan bishop of the Diocese of Galle. Perera resigned in 2004.

Notes

1932 births
2015 deaths
20th-century Roman Catholic bishops in Sri Lanka
21st-century Roman Catholic bishops in Sri Lanka